Maria Semyonovna Zavalishina (born 26 December 1903) was a Soviet composer and teacher.

Zavalishina was born in Saint Petersburg, Russia. She studied composition at the Leningrad Musical College, graduating in 1929. From 1929 to 1934 she was head of the music department of the Northern Siberian Dramatic Theatre, and from 1938 to 1941, an inspector of the Odessa (Ukraine) Art Department. She studied composition at the Conservatory of Odessa during 1939. From 1941 to 1944 she founded and was headmistress of the Music School in Sovetsk, Kirov Oblast, Russia. From 1944 to 1955 she was on the Artistic Committee of the Moldavian Soviet Socialist Republic (today known as the Republic of Moldova) and from 1945 to 1951 lectured at the Odesa Conservatory. In 1951, she began serving as a deputy artistic director of an unspecified orchestra. Zavalishina composed incidental music for over 80 plays and films.

Her compositions include:

Chamber 

Elegy, Romance (horn and piano; 1962)
Happy Piece (oboe and piano; 1964)
Melody (violin and piano; 1938)
Melody, Nocturne, Little Waltz (cello and piano; 1963)
Romance (violin and piano; 1938)
Three (violin and piano; 1969)

Incidental music 

for more than 80 plays and films

Opera 

Esli Druzya (1966)

Operetta 

Kol I Druzie in Three Acts For Children (Muzichna Ukraina, 1978)

Orchestra 

Igrushki, Children's Suite (1939)

Piano 

Children's Album (1952)
Pro Zaiku, Six Pieces (1964)
Suite (1937)
Ten Children's Pieces (1961)

Vocal 

arrangements of various folk and children's songs
Idut Kommunisty (A. Chepurov; a capella chorus; 1951)
K Portretu (Lermontov; with piano; 1938)
Lipka (P. Voronko; a capella chorus; 1950)
Nad Dniepnom (I. Radchenko; with piano; 1951)
Pyatnadtsat Let (Pushkin; with piano; 1937)
S Toboiu Mysi Moya (V. Gete; with piano; 1939)
Trostnik (Lermontov; with piano; 1938)

References

1903 births
Women opera composers
Musicians from Saint Petersburg
Soviet opera composers
Year of death missing
Moldovan musicians